Greya kononenkoi is a moth of the family Prodoxidae. It is found in low-shrub tundra on the Chukchi Peninsula in eastern Siberia.

The wingspan is 14–15 mm. The forewings are brownish fuscous with a slight bronzy shine and about ten near-white costal, dorsal, and apical spots.

References

Moths described in 1996
Prodoxidae